God-shaped hole is a concept in theology. God-shaped hole or God-Shaped Hole may refer to:

 God-Shaped Hole, a novel by Tiffanie DeBartolo
 God Shaped Hole, a 2010 album by Reverend Freakchild
 "God-Shaped Hole", a song by Audio Adrenaline from the 1997 album Some Kind of Zombie
 "God-shaped Hole", a single by Christian singer Plumb from the 1999 album candycoatedwaterdrops